Queen crab refers to different species in different parts of the world.

Chionoecetes spp. in Canada
Pseudocarcinus gigas, the Tasmanian giant crab, in Australia

Animal common name disambiguation pages